Marriage, Iranian Style is a 2006 Iranian romantic comedy film directed by Hassan Fathi.

Plot 
It tells the story of love and eventual marriage of an Iranian girl named Shirin (Shila Khodadad) and an American engineer working in Iran named David (Daniel E Holmes). The screenplay was written by Minoo Farshchi.

References

External links
Marriage, Iranian Style

2006 films
2000s Persian-language films
2006 romantic comedy films
Iranian romantic comedy films